These are the Minnesota Golden Gophers annual team award recipients.

Season awards

References

College football annual team awards by team
Awards
Minnesota sports-related lists